is a 1957 Japanese drama film by Yasujirō Ozu. It is the story of two sisters (played by Ineko Arima and Ozu regular Setsuko Hara) who are reunited with a mother who left them as children. The film is considered amongst Ozu's darkest postwar films; it is well received though lesser known. It is his last film shot in black and white.

Synopsis
Akiko Sugiyama (Ineko Arima) is a college student learning English shorthand. Her elder sister Takako (Setsuko Hara), running away from an unhappy marriage, has returned home to stay with Akiko and their father Shukichi (Chishū Ryū) in Tokyo, together with her toddler girl. Shukichi works in a bank in Tokyo. Akiko has a relationship with her college boyfriend Kenji (Masami Taura), which results in an unwanted pregnancy. Later, Akiko has an abortion, after an encounter in which she realizes that her boyfriend does not love her.

While going to a mahjong parlour to look for Kenji, Akiko comes across its proprietress Kisako (Isuzu Yamada), who seems to know a lot about her family. Back at home, Takako hears about Kisako from Akiko, and pieces together the fact that she is their long-lost mother. Takako visits the parlour to ask Kisako not to reveal to Akiko who she really is – but the plan backfires. Akiko learns of her visit and goes to confront Takako. Takako then discloses to her that Kisako is their mother, who ran away with another man when Akiko was still a toddler. Shaken, Akiko goes to confront Kisako to ask if she is the daughter of her father. She leaves in a huff, upset by Kisako abandoning her as a child, then goes to a Chinese noodle shop for some sake. Her boyfriend Kenji enters, and the two have an argument. Akiko leaves angrily, and she is hit by a train at an intersection just outside the shop.

Akiko is badly injured, and she expresses the wish to live and start life over again in the presence of her father and sister. In the next scene, however, in one of Ozu's famous ellipses, a bitter Takako goes to visit her mother to tell her the news of Akiko's death. Kisako is distraught, and agrees with her husband that she will leave Tokyo for his new job in Hokkaido. Just prior to their departure, she goes to the Sugiyamas to offer her condolences, and to tell Takako of her decision. Takako does not go to send her off at the railway station.

In the last scene of the film, Takako reveals to her father that she is going back to her husband to try to make their marriage work again. She does not want her daughter to have the same experience as Akiko, who grew up without knowing one of her parents. Shukichi agrees with her decision.

Cast

Reception
Several reviewers consider Tokyo Twilight to be one of the director's bleakest works. While rarely screened, it has a 100% on Rotten Tomatoes with an average rating of 7.8/10. In The New Yorker, Richard Brody argued, "This turbulent and grim family melodrama, from 1957, is steered away from the maudlin and given emotional depth and philosophical heft under the direction of Yasujiro Ozu." Fred Camper of the Chicago Reader declared it one of the director's best works and wrote, "The father and elder daughter try to meet the world with a gaze as steady as that of Ozu's static camera, ultimately resigning themselves to accepting tragedy, which is presented as inevitable in the flow of life." In 2009 the film was ranked at No. 106 on the list of the Greatest Japanese Films of All Time by Japanese film magazine kinema Junpo.

References

External links
 
 

1957 films
1957 drama films
Japanese drama films
Films directed by Yasujirō Ozu
Films with screenplays by Yasujirō Ozu
Films with screenplays by Kogo Noda
Films set in Tokyo
Japanese black-and-white films
Shochiku films
1950s Japanese films